Events in the year 1876 in India.

Incumbents
Thomas Baring, 1st Earl of Northbrook, Viceroy
Robert Bulwer-Lytton, 1st Earl of Lytton, Viceroy (from 12 April)

Events
National income - ₹3,887 million
 Queen Victoria is proclaimed "Empress of India" and transfers powers from East India Company to the British Crown.
Lokopriya Gopinath Bordoloi Regional Institute of Mental Health was set up as Tezpur Lunatic Asylum in April, 1876.

Law
Royal Titles Act (British statute)
Customs Consolidation Act (British statute)
Slave Trade Act (British statute)
Statute Law Revision (Substituted Enactments) Act (British statute)

Births
15 September – Sharat Chandra Chatterji, novelist (d. 1938).
25 December – Muhammad Ali Jinnah, Statesman and founder of Pakistan (d. 1948).

References

 
India
Years of the 19th century in India